Christopher Patterson may refer to:

 Chris Patterson (co-driver) (born 1968), rally co-driver
 Chris Patterson (politician) (born 1971), Australian politician
 Christopher Salmon Patterson (1823–1893), Canadian Puisne judge of the Supreme Court of Canada

See also
 Chris Paterson (born 1978), Scottish rugby union player
 Chris Paterson (rugby league) (born 1980), Australian
 Patterson (surname)